Nityanand Swami may refer to:
Nityanand Swami (Paramhansa) (1754–1850), a Paramhansa saint of the Swaminarayan Sampraday
Nityanand Swami (politician) (1927–2012), a politician and 1st Chief Minister of Uttaranchal (now Uttarakhand)